The 1998 Western Michigan Broncos football team represented Western Michigan University in the Mid-American Conference (MAC) during the 1998 NCAA Division I-A football season.  In their second season under head coach Gary Darnell, the Broncos compiled a 7–4 record (5–3 against MAC opponents), finished in third place in the MAC's West Division, and outscored their opponents, 360 to 312.  The team played its home games at Waldo Stadium in Kalamazoo, Michigan.

The team's statistical leaders included Tim Lester with 3,311 passing yards, Darnell Fields with 1,016 rushing yards, and Steve Neal with 1,121 receiving yards. Kicker Brad Selent was named the MAC special teams player of the year.

Schedule

References

Western Michigan
Western Michigan Broncos football seasons
Western Michigan Broncos football